Quinten Post (born 21 March 2000) is a Dutch college basketball player who plays for the Boston College Eagles of the Atlantic Coast Conference (ACC). Standing at 7 ft 0 in (2.13 m), he plays as forward and center.

He also plays in the Netherlands national team since making his debut in 2022.

Early career 
Born in Amsterdam, Post played in the junior teams of Apollo Amsterdam. He won the national under-18 championship in 2018 as the starting center. He attended the  Cartesius Lyceum.

College career 
In 2019, Post committed to Mississippi State Bulldogs. He transferred to the Boston College Eagles for his junior year in the 2021–22 season.

National team career 
Post was selected for the preliminary roster of the Netherlands senior team ahead of EuroBasket 2022.

References

Dutch men's basketball players
Centers (basketball)
2000 births
Living people
Sportspeople from Amsterdam
Mississippi State Bulldogs men's basketball players
Boston College Eagles men's basketball players